Sam Fink (born May 8, 1993) is an American soccer player.

Career

College
Fink played four years of college soccer at Wake Forest University between 2011 and 2014.

Professional
On March 7, 2015, it was announced that Fink had signed with USL team Saint Louis FC. He scored his first professional goal on May 9 during a match against Wilmington Hammerheads FC at World Wide Technology Soccer Park, earning a spot on the USL Team of the Week. He was again named to the Team of the Week following his performance in a come-from-behind victory at home against the Charleston Battery on August 20, becoming the first Saint Louis FC player to receive the award twice. Fink played every minute of all 28 games during the 2015 season, one of just two USL players to manage the feat that year.

Fink was released by Saint Louis FC on November 10, 2016.

On November 30, 2016, Fink was signed by fellow USL Western Conference side Oklahoma City Energy FC.

On December 13, 2017, Fink was re-signed by his hometown and debut club, Saint Louis FC for the 2018 season. Saint Louis FC folded following the 2020 USL Championship season.

References

External links

Wake Forest bio

1993 births
Living people
American soccer players
Association football defenders
OKC Energy FC players
People from Edwardsville, Illinois
Saint Louis FC players
Soccer players from Illinois
Sportspeople from Greater St. Louis
USL Championship players
Wake Forest Demon Deacons men's soccer players